Trygve Hegnar (born 6 October 1943) is a Norwegian businessperson, investor and chief editor of the business magazines Kapital and Finansavisen, founded by Hegnar himself in 1971 and 1992 respectively. He is a billionaire in NOK (Norwegian krone).

Early life
Hegnar was born in Oslo. He became Norwegian champion in team handball with the club SK Arild in 1964, and played for the Norwegian national team at the 1964 World Men's Handball Championship. He studied in Germany, and graduated as an economist. He started his career as a researcher at the Institute of Transport Economics upon his return to Norway.

Career
He founded the business magazine Kapital in 1971, which became known for its revealing market news from anonymous writers (often student friends of Hegnar). Hegnar found a particular interest in, and wrote a biography of industrialist Vebjørn Tandberg, and later acquired Tandberg's villa which he turned into the headquarters of Kapital. According to Hegnar, he made his first million NOK in 1976, which he used on the short-lived failed tabloid paper Blikk in 1977.

In 1992 Hegnar used his 26 million NOK profits from selling his shares in Dagens Næringsliv to establish his own rival business newspaper Finansavisen. Hegnar's fortune was estimated by Kapital at 2 billion NOK in 2000, most of which dates from his ownership in the Norwegian Cruise Line (formerly Kloster Cruise with ownership in Vard) from the 1980s, which he sold to Star Cruises. According to himself he initially invested 5 million NOK in 1981, followed by some more, until he sold his shares for 672 million NOK in 1999; roughly a hundred-fold profit.

References

External links
 Hegnar Online, online news site

1943 births
Living people
Writers from Oslo
Norwegian businesspeople
Norwegian newspaper editors
Norwegian magazine editors
Norwegian male handball players
Norwegian biographers
Norwegian male writers
Male biographers